

Franchise records for regular season

Most points scored in a game
 Donovan Mitchell – 71
 LeBron James – 57
 Kyrie Irving – 57
 LeBron James – 56
 Kyrie Irving – 55

Highest points per game in a season
 LeBron James – 31.4
 LeBron James – 30.0
 LeBron James – 29.7
 LeBron James – 28.4
 LeBron James – 27.5

Most defensive rebounds (since 1973–74)

Most offensive rebounds (since 1973–74)

Most total rebounds
 LeBron James – 6,190
 Zydrunas Ilgauskas – 5,904
 Tristan Thompson – 5,393
 Brad Daugherty – 5,227
 Hot Rod Williams – 4,669Most rebounds in a game Anderson Varejão – 25
 Rick Roberson – 25
 Andre Drummond – 24
 Brad Daugherty – 24
 Elmore Smith – 24Highest rebounds per game in a season Anderson Varejão – 14.4Most assists in a game'''
 Geoff Huston – 27
 Andre Miller – 22
 Brevin Knight – 20
 Mark Price – 20
 Geoff Huston – 20

References

National Basketball Association accomplishments and records by team
accomplishments